The Defiant Ones is a 1986 American made-for-television crime drama film directed by David Lowell Rich starring Robert Urich and Carl Weathers. It is a remake of the 1958 film of the same name.

Synopsis 
Cullen Monroe and Johnny "Joker" Johnson are prisoners who hate each other and get into a fistfight, causing them to be transported to a different jailhouse by car. During transport they come to blows again, causing an accident. They escape the car but remain chained to each other while the sheriff hunts them.

Cast 
 Robert Urich as Johnny "Joker" Johnson
 Carl Weathers as Cullen Monroe
 Ed Lauter as Sheriff Leroy Doyle
 Barry Corbin as Floyd Carpenter
 Laurie O'Brien as Pauline
 Thalmus Rasulala as Fred
 William Sanderson as Mason
 Ritch Brinkley as Lonny
 Ebbe Roe Smith as Deputy Miller
 Wil Wheaton as Clyde
 Charles Bartlett as Jeffcoat
 Richard Fullerton as First Guard
 Bob Harris as Driver

Production and broadcast 
The film is a remake of The Defiant Ones, the 1958 film that inspired Carl Weathers to become an actor. It premiered on ABC at 9:00 p.m. on Sunday, January 5, 1986.

Reception
In comparing the film to the original version, Walter Goodman of The New York Times wrote that "1986 is not 1958" and joked that the remake is "nothing if not moving. The two keep moving from the opening credits to the close." He further opined that the film contained "enough running music to score the New York Marathon."

References

External links 
 

1986 television films
1986 films
1986 crime drama films
ABC network original films
American crime drama films
Crime television films
American drama television films
Films directed by David Lowell Rich
Films scored by Steve Dorff
American buddy drama films
American chase films
Films about criminals
Films about race and ethnicity
Television remakes of films
1980s buddy drama films
1980s English-language films
1980s American films